Rodionovo is a rural locality (a village) in Nagornoye Rural Settlement, Petushinsky District, Vladimir Oblast, Russia. The population was 7 as of 2010. There are 5 streets.

Geography 
Rodionovo is located 42 km northwest of Petushki (the district's administrative centre) by road. Plotavtsevo is the nearest rural locality.

References 

Rural localities in Petushinsky District